John F. Kennedy Medical Center is the national medical center of Liberia, located in the Sinkor district of Monrovia.

History
The JFK Medical Center was built at the request of Liberian President William V.S. Tubman, whose 1961 visit with U.S. President John F. Kennedy laid the groundwork for USAID funding for a national medical center in Liberia.  The project was funded with a $6.8 million loan and $9.2 million in grants from USAID and a $1 million contribution from the Liberian Government.  Construction began in 1965 and the facility opened on July 27, 1971.

When dedicated, the Medical Center was composed of four institutions:
John F. Kennedy Memorial Hospital
Maternity Hospital
Tubman National Institute of Medical Arts (a paramedical and nursing school)
Catherine Mills Rehabilitation Hospital (a psychiatric care facility)

The maternity hospital was rebuilt in 1981 with funding from the Japanese government and named the Liberian-Japanese Friendship Maternity Hospital.

The Catherine Mills Rehabilitation Hospital was completely destroyed during the Liberian civil conflict. JFK now is affiliated with the E.S. Grant Mental Health Hospital, located in Paynesville, Monrovia.

Liberian Civil War
The facility sustained heavy damage over the 23-year period of civil unrest that began with the 1980 coup led by Samuel Doe and lasted until 2003.  The main hospital, which at five stories is one of the tallest structures in the vicinity, was at one point occupied by rebel forces and used as a machine gun outpost overlooking Tubman Boulevard, a major road linking the Sinkor neighborhood with downtown Monrovia. The hospital was also used at one time by the Red Cross and Médecins Sans Frontières as a field hospital for the war wounded.

Renovations
Scottish philanthropist Ann Gloag funded a partial renovation of the hospital wards in the main hospital, which was completed in 2009.

General administrators
The General Administrator is in charge of all the component organizations that make up the Medical Center and is appointed by the President of Liberia.  Former General Administrators include:
Dr. Moses Kronyanh Weefur: 1971–1980
Dr. Wvannie Mae Scott-McDonald: 2007–2017
Dr. Jerry F. Brown: 2018–Present

See also 
 List of hospitals in Liberia
 2014 Ebola virus epidemic in Liberia

References

Hospitals in Monrovia
Hospital buildings completed in 1971
Hospitals established in 1971
Health facilities that treated Ebola patients
1970s establishments in Liberia